Jandrei Chitolina Carniel (born 1 March 1993), simply known as Jandrei, is a Brazilian professional footballer who plays as a goalkeeper for São Paulo FC.

Club career

Early career
Born in Itaqui, Rio Grande do Sul, Jandrei was an Internacional youth graduate. He left the club in September 2014 without making any senior appearances, and joined Novo Hamburgo.

Jandrei made his Campeonato Gaúcho debut on 11 February 2015, coming on as a first-half substitute for Thiago Humberto in a 1–0 home win against União Frederiquense, as starter Rafael dal Ri was sent off. He appeared in four matches during the tournament, two as a starter.

In May 2016, Jandrei moved to Atlético Tubarão in the second tier of Campeonato Catarinense. He was a regular starter for the club, contributing with 13 appearances as his side achieved promotion back to the first division.

Chapecoense
On 1 March 2017, Jandrei signed a loan contract with Série A club Chapecoense, with a buyout clause. Initially a third choice behind Artur Moraes and Elias, he made his debut in the top tier on 13 May, starting in a 1–1 away draw against Corinthians.

Jandrei made his Copa Libertadores debut on 17 May 2017, starting in a 2–1 away win against Lanús. He immediately became first-choice after his arrival, overtaking both Artur and Elias.

On 15 November 2017, Jandrei was bought outright for a fee of R$350,000, and renewed his contract until 2021.

Genoa
On 6 January 2019, Jandrei signed with Italian Serie A club Genoa. He made his debut abroad on 9 March, starting in a 0–1 loss at Parma, but spent the campaign as a backup to Ionuț Radu.

After falling further down the pecking order after the arrival of Mattia Perin, Jandrei was loaned out to Athletico Paranaense back in his home country on 13 February 2020, until June 2021. He was mainly a second-choice behind regular starter Santos, and terminated his contract with his parent club on 23 August 2021.

Santos
On 25 August 2021, Jandrei agreed to a short-term deal with Santos. He made his club debut on 17 October, starting in a 0–0 away draw against Sport Recife.

São Paulo
On 20 December 2021, Jandrei agreed to a two-year contract with São Paulo, effective as of the following January.

Career statistics

Honours
Athletico Paranaense
Campeonato Paranaense: 2020

References

External links

1993 births
Living people
Sportspeople from Rio Grande do Sul
Brazilian footballers
Association football goalkeepers
Campeonato Brasileiro Série A players
Esporte Clube Novo Hamburgo players
Associação Chapecoense de Futebol players
Club Athletico Paranaense players
Santos FC players
São Paulo FC players
Serie A players
Genoa C.F.C. players
Brazilian expatriate footballers
Brazilian expatriate sportspeople in Italy
Expatriate footballers in Italy